Maxime Weygand (21 January 1867 – 28 January 1965) was a French military commander in World War I and World War II and perpetrator of anti-semitic polices during The Holocaust as a high ranking member of the Vichy regime. 

Born in Belgium, Weygand was raised in France and educated at the Saint-Cyr military academy in Paris. After graduating in 1887, he went on to become an instructor at the Cavalry School at Saumur. During World War I, Weygand served as a staff officer to General (later Marshal) Ferdinand Foch. He then served as an advisor to Poland in the Polish–Soviet War and later High Commissioner of the Levant. In 1931, Weygand was appointed Chief of Staff of the French Army, a position he served until his retirement in 1935 at the age of 68.

In May 1940, Weygand was recalled for active duty and assumed command of the French Army during the German invasion. Following a series of military setbacks, Weygand advised armistice and France subsequently capitulated. He joined Philippe Pétain's Vichy regime as Minister for Defence and served until September 1940, when he was appointed Delegate-General in French North Africa. He was noted for exceptionally harsh implementation of German Anti-Semitic policies while in this position. Despite this, Weygand favoured only limited collaboration with Germany and was dismissed from his post in November 1941 on Hitler's demand. Following the Allied invasion of North Africa in November 1942, Weygand was arrested by the Germans and imprisoned at Itter Castle in Austria until May 1945. After returning to France, he was held as a collaborator at the Val-de-Grâce but was released in 1946 and cleared of charges in 1948. He died in January 1965 in Paris at the age of 98.

Early years 

Weygand was born in Brussels of unknown parents. He was long suspected of being the illegitimate son of either Empress Carlota of Mexico and General Alfred Van der Smissen; or of her brother Leopold II, King of the Belgians, and Leopold's Polish mistress. Van der Smissen always seemed a likely candidate for Weygand's father because of the striking resemblance between the two men. In 2003, the French journalist Dominique Paoli claimed to have found evidence that Weygand's father was indeed van der Smissen, but the mother was Mélanie Zichy-Metternich, lady-in-waiting to Carlota (and daughter of Prince Klemens von Metternich, Austrian Chancellor). Paoli further claimed that Weygand had been born in mid-1865, not January 1867 as is generally claimed.

Regardless, throughout his life, Weygand maintained he did not know his true parentage. While an infant he was sent to Marseille to be raised by a widow named Virginie Saget, whom he originally took to be his mother. At age 6 he was transferred to the household of David Cohen de Léon, a financier of Sephardic origins who was a friend of Leopold II. Upon reaching adulthood, Weygand was legally acknowledged as a son by Francois-Joseph Weygand, an accountant in the employ of M. Cohen de Léon, thereby granting him French citizenship.

He says little about his youth in his memoirs, devoting to it only 4 pages out of 651. He mentions the gouvernante and the aumônier of his college, who instilled in him a strong Roman Catholic faith. His memoirs essentially begin with his entry into the preparatory class of Saint-Cyr Military School in Paris.

Military career 
Weygand was admitted to the École Spéciale Militaire de Saint-Cyr, under the name of "Maxime de Nimal" as a foreign cadet (Belgian). Graduating in 1887, he was posted to a cavalry regiment. After changing his name to Weygand and receiving French nationality, he became an instructor at Saumur.

During the Dreyfus affair, Weygand was one of the most anti-Dreyfusard officers of his regiment, supporting the widow of Colonel Hubert-Joseph Henry, who had committed suicide after the discovery of the falsification of the charges against Captain Alfred Dreyfus.

Once promoted to captain, Weygand chose not to attempt the difficult preparation to the École Supérieure de Guerre (the French staff college) because of his desire, he said, to keep contact with the troops. This did not prevent him from later becoming an instructor at the Cavalry School at Saumur. He was one of the few to attend the Centre des Hautes Etudes Militaires (a school to give more strategic instruction), set up in the spring of 1909, despite not having been "breveté" (passed staff college).

Along with Joffre and Foch, Weygand attended the Imperial Russian Army manoeuvres in 1910; his account mentions a great deal of pomp and many gala dinners, but also records Russian reluctance to discuss military details. As a lieutenant colonel Weygand attended the last prewar French grand manoeuvres, in 1913, and commented that it had revealed "intolerable insufficiencies" such as two divisions becoming mixed up.

Service during World War I

Early War 
Weygand passed World War I as a staff officer. At the outbreak, he satisfied his taste for contact with the troops by spending 26 days with the 5ème Hussars. On 28 August, he joined the staff of General Ferdinand Foch, under whom he was to serve for much of the rest of the war.

Weygand was promoted to général de brigade in 1916. He later wrote of the Anglo-French Somme Offensive in 1916, at which Foch commanded French Army Group North, that it had seen "constant mix-ups with an ally [i.e. the British] learning how to run a large operation and whose doctrines and methods were not yet in accordance with ours".

Supreme War Council 
British prime minister David Lloyd George pushed for the creation of a Supreme War Council, which was formally established on 7 November 1917. Keen to sideline the British Chief of the Imperial General Staff, General Sir William Robertson, he insisted that, as French Army chief of the General Staff, Foch could not also be French permanent military representative (PMR) on the SWC. Paul Painlevé, French prime minister until 13 November, believed that Lloyd George was already pushing for Foch to be Supreme Allied Commander so wanted him as PMR not French Chief of Staff.

The new prime minister, Georges Clemenceau, wanted Foch as PMR to increase French control over the Western Front, but was persuaded to appoint Weygand, seen very much as Foch's sidekick, instead. Clemenceau told US President Woodrow Wilson's envoy, Colonel Edward M. House that he would put in a "second- or third-rate man" as PMR and "let the thing drift where it will".

Weygand was the most junior of the PMRs (the others being the Italian Luigi Cadorna, the American Tasker H. Bliss, and the British Henry Wilson, later replaced by Henry Rawlinson). He was promoted général de division (equivalent to the Anglophone rank of major general) in 1918. This promotion was specifically because of his appointment as a PMR.

However, Clemenceau only agreed to set up an Allied General Reserve if Foch rather than Weygand were earmarked to command it. The Reserve was shelved for the time being at a SWC Meeting in London (14–15 March 1918) as the national commanders in chief, Philippe Pétain and Sir Douglas Haig, were reluctant to release divisions.

Supreme Allied Command Staff 
Weygand was in charge of Foch's staff when his patron was appointed Supreme Allied Commander in the spring of 1918, and was Foch's right-hand man throughout his victories in the late summer and until the end of the war.

Weygand initially headed a small staff of 25–30 officers, with Brigadier General Pierre Desticker as his deputy. There was a separate head for each of the departments, e.g. Operations, Intelligence, Q (Quartermaster). From June 1918 onwards, under British pressure, Foch and Weygand poached staff officers from the French Commander-in-Chief Philippe Pétain (Lloyd George's tentative suggestion of a multinational Allied staff was vetoed by President Wilson). By early August Colonel Payot (responsible for supply and transport) had moved to Foch's HQ, as had the Military Missions from the other Allied HQs; in Greenhalgh's words this "put real as opposed to nominal power into Foch's hands". From early July onwards, British military and political leaders came to regret Foch's increased power, but Weygand later recorded that they had only themselves to blame as they had pushed for the change.

Like Foch and most French leaders of his era (Clemenceau, who had lived in the US as a young man, was a rare exception), Weygand could not speak enough English to "sustain a conversation" (German, not English, was the most common second language in which French officers were qualified). Competent interpreters were therefore vital.

Weygand drew up the memorandum for the meeting of Foch with the national commanders-in-chief (Haig, Pétain and John J. Pershing) on 24 July 1918, the only such meeting before the autumn, in which Foch urged (successfully) the liberation of the Marne salient captured by the Germans in May (this offensive would become the Second Battle of the Marne, for which Foch was promoted Marshal of France), along with further offensives by the British and by the Americans at St Mihiel. Weygand personally delivered the directive for the Amiens attack to Haig. Foch and Weygand were shown around the liberated St. Mihiel sector by Pershing on 20 September.

Weygand later (in 1922) questioned whether Pétain's planned offensive by twenty-five divisions in Lorraine in November 1918 could have been supplied through a "zone of destruction" through which the Germans were retreating; his own and Foch's doubts about the feasibility of the plans were another factor in the seeking of an armistice. In 1918 Weygand served on the armistice negotiations, and it was Weygand who read out the armistice conditions to the Germans at Compiègne, in the railway carriage. He can be spotted in photographs of the armistice delegates, and also standing behind Foch's shoulder at Pétain's investiture as Marshal of France at the end of 1918.

Interwar

Poland 
During the Polish–Soviet War, Weygand was a member of the Interallied Mission to Poland of July and August 1920, supporting the infant Second Polish Republic against the Russian Soviet Federative Socialist Republic. (He had not been on the 1919 French Military Mission to Poland headed by General Paul Prosper Henrys.) The Interallied Mission, which also included French diplomat Jean Jules Jusserand and the British diplomat Lord Edgar Vincent D'Abernon, achieved little: its report was submitted after the Polish Armed Forces had won the crucial Battle of Warsaw. Nonetheless, the presence of the Allied missions in Poland gave rise to a myth that the timely arrival of Allied forces saved Poland.

Weygand travelled to Warsaw expecting to assume command of the Polish army, yet those expectations were quickly dashed. He had no good reply for Józef Piłsudski, who on 24 July during their first meeting asked "How many divisions do you bring?" Weygand had none to offer. From 27 July Weygand was an adviser to the Polish Chief of Staff, Tadeusz Jordan-Rozwadowski. It was a difficult position; most Polish officers regarded him as an interloper, and spoke only Polish, which he did not understand. At the end of July he proposed that the Poles hold the length of the Bug River; a week later he proposed a purely defensive posture along the Vistula River; both plans were rejected, as were most of his other suggestions. One of his few lasting contributions was to insist on replacing the existing system of spoken orders by written documents. Norman Davies writes: "on the whole he was quite out of his element, a man trained to give orders yet placed among people without the inclination to obey, a proponent of defence in the company of enthusiasts for the attack." During another meeting with Piłsudski on 18 August, Weygand became offended and threatened to leave, depressed by his failure and dismayed by Poland's disregard for the Allied powers. At the station at Warsaw on 25 August he was consoled by the award of the Virtuti Militari, 2nd class; at Paris on the 28th he was cheered by crowds lining the platform of the Gare de l'Est, kissed on both cheeks by the Premier Alexandre Millerand and presented with the Grand Cross of the Legion of Honour. He could not understand what had happened and has admitted in his memoirs what he said to a French journalist already on 21 August 1920: that "the victory was Polish, the plan was Polish, the army was Polish". As Norman Davies notes: "He was the first uncomprehending victim, as well as the chief beneficiary, of a legend already in circulation that he, Weygand, was the victor of Warsaw. This legend persisted for more than forty years even in academic circles."

France and the Middle East 
Weygand was unemployed for a time after the military mission to Poland, but in 1923 he was made commander-in-chief Levant, the French mandate in Lebanon and Syria. He was then appointed High Commissioner of Syria the next year, a position he also only kept for a year.

Weygand returned to France in 1925, when he became director of the Center for Higher Military Studies, a position he had for five years. In 1931 he was appointed Chief of Staff of the French Army, vice president of the Supreme War Council and Inspector of the Army, and was elected a member of the Académie française (seat #35). He remained in the positions, except Inspector of the Army, until his retirement in 1935 at 68.

Weygand was recalled for active service in August 1939 by Prime Minister Édouard Daladier and appointed commander-in-chief for the Orient Theatre of Operation.

World War II 

By late May 1940 the military disaster in France after the German invasion was such that the Supreme Commander—and political neutral—Maurice Gamelin, was dismissed, and Weygand—a figurehead of the right—recalled from Syria to replace him.

Weygand arrived on 17 May and started by cancelling the flank counter-offensive ordered by Gamelin, to cut off the enemy armoured columns which had punched through the French front at the Ardennes. Thus he lost two crucial days before finally adopting the solution, however obvious, of his predecessor. But it was by then a failed manoeuvre, because during the 48 lost hours, the German Army infantry had caught up behind their tanks in the breakthrough and had consolidated their gains.

Weygand then oversaw the creation of the Weygand Line, an early application of the Hedgehog tactic; however, by this point the situation was untenable, with most of the Allied forces trapped in Belgium. Weygand complained that he had been summoned two weeks too late to halt the invasion.

On 5 June the German second offensive (Fall Rot) began. On 8 June Weygand was visited by Charles de Gaulle, newly appointed to the government as Under-Secretary for War. According to de Gaulle's memoirs Weygand believed it was "the end" and gave a "despairing laugh" when de Gaulle suggested fighting on. He believed that after France was defeated Britain would also soon sue for peace, and hoped that after an armistice the Germans would allow him to retain enough of a French Army to "maintain order" in France. Weygand later disputed the accuracy of de Gaulle's account of this conversation, and remarked on its similarity to a dialogue by Pierre Corneille. De Gaulle's biographer Jean Lacouture suggests that de Gaulle's account is consistent with other evidence of Weygand's beliefs at the time and is therefore, allowing perhaps for a little literary embellishment, broadly plausible.

Fascist Italy entered the war and invaded France on 10 June. That day Weygand barged into the office of Prime Minister Paul Reynaud and demanded an armistice. Weygand was present at the Anglo-French Conference at the Chateau du Muguet at Briare on 11 June, at which the option was discussed of continuing the French war effort from Brittany or French North Africa. The transcript shows Weygand to have been somewhat less defeatist than de Gaulle's memoirs would suggest. At the Cabinet meeting on the evening of 13 June, after another Anglo-French conference at Tours, Marshal Pétain, Deputy Prime Minister, strongly supported Weygand's demand for an armistice. On June 14 Weygand warned the high-ranking British officer Alan Brooke that the French Army was collapsing and incapable of fighting further, leading him to evacuate the final British Expeditionary Force contingents remaining on the Western Front.

The French government moved to Bordeaux on 14 June. At Cabinet on 15 June Reynaud urged that they should follow the Dutch example, that the Army should lay down its arms so that the fight could be continued from abroad. Pétain was sympathetic, but he was sent to speak to Weygand (who was waiting outside, as he was not a member of the Cabinet). After no more than fifteen minutes Weygand persuaded him that this would be a shameful surrender. Chautemps then proposed a compromise proposal, that the Germans be approached about possible armistice terms. The Cabinet voted 13–6 for the Chautemps proposal.

After Reynaud's resignation as Prime Minister on 16 June, President Albert Lebrun felt he had little choice but to appoint Pétain, who already had a ministerial team ready, as prime minister. Weygand joined the new government as Minister for Defence, and was briefly able to veto the appointment of Pierre Laval as minister of foreign affairs.

Collaboration during the Vichy Regime 
The Vichy regime was set up in July 1940. Weygand continued to serve in Pétain's cabinet as Minister for National Defence until September 1940. He was then appointed Delegate-General in French North Africa.

In North Africa, he persuaded young officers, tempted to join the French Resistance against the German occupation, to go along with the armistice for the present, by letting them hope for a later resumption of combat. With the complicity of Admiral Jean-Marie Charles Abrial, he deported opponents of Vichy to concentration camps in Southern Algeria and Morocco. Those imprisoned included Gaullists, Freemasons, and Jews, and also Communists, despite their obedience at the time to the Soviet Union's orders not to support the resistance. He also arrested the foreign volunteers of the Légion Etrangère, foreign refugees who were in France legally but were without employment, and others. He applied Vichy anti-Jewish legislation very harshly. With the complicity of the Recteur (University chancellor) Georges Hardy, Weygand instituted, on his own authority, by a mere "note de service" (n°343QJ of 30 September 1941), a school numerus clausus (quota). This drove out most Jewish students from the colleges and the primary schools, including children aged 5 to 11. Weygand did this without any order from Pétain, "by analogy," he said, "to the law about Higher Education."
Weygand acquired a reputation as an opponent of collaboration when he protested in Vichy against the Paris Protocols of 28 May 1941, signed by Admiral François Darlan. These agreements authorized the Axis powers to establish bases in French colonies: at Aleppo, Syria; Bizerte, Tunisia; and Dakar, Senegal. The Protocols also envisaged extensive French military collaboration with Axis forces in the event of Allied attacks against such bases. Weygand remained outspoken in his criticism of Germany.

Weygand opposed Wehrmacht bases in French territory not to help the Allies or even to keep France neutral, but rather to preserve the integrity of the French Empire and maintain prestige in the eyes of the natives. Weygand apparently favoured limited collaboration with Germany. The Weygand General Delegation (4th Office) delivered military equipment to the Panzer Armee Afrika:
1,200 French trucks and other Armistice Army vehicles (Dankworth contract of 1941), and also heavy artillery with 1,000 shells per gun. However, Adolf Hitler demanded full unconditional collaboration and pressured the Vichy government to dismiss Weygand in November 1941 and recall him from North Africa. A year later, in November 1942, following the Allied invasion of North Africa, the Germans arrested Weygand. He remained in custody in Germany and then in the Itter Castle in North Tyrol with General Gamelin and a few other French Third Republic personalities until May 1945. He was liberated by United States Army troops after the Battle for Castle Itter.

Last years 
After returning to France, Weygand was held as a collaborator at the Val-de-Grâce but was released in May 1946 and cleared in 1948. He died on 28 January 1965 in Paris at the age of 98. He had married Marie-Renée, the daughter of Brigadier General Viscount de Forsanz, of Brittany. They had two sons, Édouard and Jacques.

Beirut still holds his name on one of its major streets, Rue Weygand.

Decorations 
  France:
 Légion d'honneur
 Knight (10 July 191?)
 Officer (10 December 1914)
 Commander (28 December 1918)
 Grand Officer (1 September 1920)
 Grand Cross (6 December 1924)
 Médaille militaire (8 July 1930)
 Croix de Guerre 1914–1918 with 3 palms
 Croix de Guerre 1939–1945 with 2 palms
 Croix de guerre des théâtres d'opérations extérieures with 1 palm
 Médaille Interalliée de la Victoire
 Médaille Commémorative de la Grande Guerre
 :
 Commander of the Order of the Crown
 Croix de guerre
 : Distinguished Service Medal
 : Grand Cross of the Ouissam Alaouite Chérifien
 :
 Companion of the Order of the Bath
 Knight Commander of the Order of St Michael and St George
 : Grand Cross of the Order of the Sword (1939)
 : Order of Lāčplēsis, 2nd class.
 : Order of the White Eagle

References

Further reading

First World War

Polish period 
 Edgar Vincent d'Abernon, The Eighteenth Decisive Battle of the World: Warsaw, 1920, Hyperion Press, 1977, .
 Piotr Wandycz, General Weygand and the Battle of Warsaw, Journal of Central European Affairs, 1960
 Norman Davies, White Eagle, Red Star: the Polish-Soviet War, 1919–20, Pimlico, 2003, .

Second World War 
 Nicholas Atkin, Pétain, Longman, 1997, 
 Noel Barber, The Week France Fell, MacMillan London Limited, London, 1976.
 Yves Maxime Danan, La vie politique à Alger de 1940 à 1944, Librairie générale de Droit et de Jurisprudence, Paris, 1963.
 Simon Kitson, Vichy et la Chasse aux Espions Nazis, Autrement, Paris, 2005.
 Simon Kitson, The Hunt for Nazi Spies: Fighting Espionage in Vichy France, Chicago, University of Chicago Press, 2008.
 Lacouture, Jean. De Gaulle: The Rebel 1890–1944 (1984; English ed. 1991), 640 pp
 William Langer, Our Vichy gamble,  Alfred Knopf, New York 1947.* Henri Michel, Vichy, année 40, Robert Laffont, Paris, 1967.
 Albert Merglen, Novembre 1942: La grande honte, L'Harmattan, Paris 1993.
 Bernard Destremau, Weygand, Perrin, Paris, 1989.
 Maxime Weygand, Recalled to Service, Heinemann, London, 1952.
 Charles Williams, Pétain, Little Brown (Time Warner Book Group UK), London, 2005, p. 206,

Notes

External links 
 
 Generals of World War II

1867 births
1965 deaths
Military personnel from Brussels
French generals
French military personnel of World War I
French Army generals of World War II
Generalissimos
Jewish French history
Members of the Académie Française
Lycée Louis-le-Grand alumni
École Spéciale Militaire de Saint-Cyr alumni
High Commissioners of the Levant
Order of the Francisque recipients
Grand Croix of the Légion d'honneur
Commanders of the Order of the Crown (Belgium)
Recipients of the Order of Lāčplēsis, 2nd class
Recipients of the Virtuti Militari
Recipients of the Croix de Guerre 1939–1945 (France)
Recipients of the Croix de guerre des théâtres d'opérations extérieures
Recipients of the Croix de guerre (Belgium)
Recipients of the Distinguished Service Medal (US Army)
Honorary Companions of the Order of the Bath
Honorary Knights Commander of the Order of St Michael and St George
French anti-communists
People of Vichy France
French collaborators with Nazi Germany
French Ministers of War and National Defence
19th-century French military personnel
20th-century French military personnel
Foreign recipients of the Distinguished Service Medal (United States)
Governors general of Algeria